Plamen Georgiev Konstantinov (born 14 June 1973) is a former Bulgarian volleyball player, a member of Bulgaria men's national volleyball team, head coach of Lokomotiv Novosibirsk and former head coach of Bulgaria men's national volleyball team.,

Personal life
Konstantinov was born in Sofia; both his parents, Georgi and Eva née Doycheva, are former volleyball internationals and his older brother Julian Konstantinov is an opera singer. Like his father, he bears the nickname Gibona ("The Gibbon").

Career
Konstantinov finished a sports school and started his career with Levski Sofia in 1986, where he remained until 1995; he spent some of the following season with Slavia Sofia and then moved to Italy to play for the Gioia del Colle team. In 1996–97, he was a member of Greek Aris VC and then of Turkish Halkbank Ankara (1997–99). From 1999 until 2004 he played in Greece for Orestiada, PAOK Thessaloniki V.C., Iraklis V.C., Olympiacos S.C. and Panathinaikos VC. In 2004–05, he was with the French Tours VB and then in 2004–05 he represented the Montichiari team. In 2005–06, he played in Poland for Jastrzębski Węgiel and then in 2006–07 he was in Russia with ZSKA Gazprom Surgut. He ended his career in Iraklis, where he played from 2007 to 2009. With Iraklis Thessaloniki he won the silver medal at the 2008-09 Indesit Champions League and also was individually awarded "Best Receiver".

Konstantinov's awards and achievements include Bulgarian championship titles with Levski and Slavia, Greek championship titles with Aris, Iraklis, Olympiacos and Panathinaikois and a French championship title with Tours. He has also won the Greek Cup once and the Supercup twice with Iraklis and the Bulgarian Cup twice with Slavia. He has twice been awarded the Greek Championship Volleyball Player of the Year prize. In 2006, he won third-place bronze medals from the 2006 FIVB Men's World Championship and the 2007 FIVB Men's World Cup in Japan with the Bulgaria national team. In 2008, he was voted Bulgaria's Man of the Year in an online poll organized by Darik Radio.

Coaching career
In 2010/11 season, he started his coaching career, as the coach of Ziraatbank of the Turkish Volleyball League.
Plamen Konstantinov has been coaching the men's National Team of Bulgaria since 2014, following a stint in Turkey and several seasons at the helm of clubs in Russia - where he continues with Lokomotiv Novosibirsk during the club season.

Awards

Individual
 2008–09 CEV Champions League "Best Receiver"
 2004 Greek Volley League "Most Valyable Player

References

External links

 Player profile at LegaVolley.it 
 
 
 
 Coach/Player Profile at Volleybox.net

1973 births
Living people
Sportspeople from Sofia
Bulgarian men's volleyball players
Olympic volleyball players of Bulgaria
Volleyball players at the 1996 Summer Olympics
Volleyball players at the 2008 Summer Olympics
Bulgarian volleyball coaches
Volleyball coaches of international teams
Bulgarian expatriate sportspeople in Italy
Expatriate volleyball players in Italy
Bulgarian expatriate sportspeople in Greece
Expatriate volleyball players in Greece
Bulgarian expatriate sportspeople in Turkey
Expatriate volleyball players in Turkey
Bulgarian expatriate sportspeople in France
Expatriate volleyball players in France
Bulgarian expatriate sportspeople in Poland
Expatriate volleyball players in Poland
Bulgarian expatriate sportspeople in Russia
Expatriate volleyball players in Russia
Aris V.C. players
Halkbank volleyball players
A.C. Orestias players
PAOK V.C. players
Iraklis V.C. players
Olympiacos S.C. players
Panathinaikos V.C. players
Jastrzębski Węgiel players
Outside hitters